The  is a proposed vertical takeoff and landing (VTVL), single-stage-to-orbit (SSTO), reusable launch system (rocket-powered spacecraft). According to a document from July 1997, it would have been manufactured by Kawasaki Heavy Industries and Mitsubishi Heavy Industries, with its formal name being the Kawasaki S-1.

Overview
This development cost was estimated  in 1995.

The name Kankō Maru is derived from the first steam-powered vessel in Edo-era Japan.

See also

 Chrysler SERV
 VentureStar
 Reusable Vehicle Testing program by JAXA/ISAS
 Blue Origin New Shepard
 Falcon 9 Full Thrust

References

External links
 Encyclopedia Astronautica entry
 宇宙旅行アーカイブ (Space Tourism Archive), Space Liner Association

Single-stage-to-orbit
Former proposed space launch system concepts
Space access
VTVL rockets
Cancelled space launch vehicles